Kesler Manufacturing Co.–Cannon Mills Co. Plant No. 7 Historic District is a national historic district located at Salisbury, Rowan County, North Carolina.  The district encompasses 109 contributing buildings and 1 contributing structure consisting of a complex of industrial buildings and mill dwellings.  It largely developed between about 1895 and 1930, and includes notable examples of Gothic Revival and Bungalow / American Craftsman style architecture. Notable buildings include the Kesler Manufacturing Company/Cannon Mills complex (1895–1930), Kepley–Trexler House, Henry–Kesler Manufacturing Company House (1910), Kimball–Kesler Mill House (1916), and Morgan–Kesler Manufacturing Company House (1914).

It was listed on the National Register of Historic Places in 1985.

References

Historic districts on the National Register of Historic Places in North Carolina
Gothic Revival architecture in North Carolina
Buildings and structures in Rowan County, North Carolina
National Register of Historic Places in Rowan County, North Carolina